Sette dollari sul rosso  (released in the United States as Seven Dollars on the Red or Seven Dollars to Kill) is a 1966 Italian Spaghetti Western film directed by Alberto Cardone. It stars Anthony Steffen as the main character.

Despite the name similarity, the film is not a part of Sergio Leone's Dollars trilogy. Evidently the film was inspired by this. On release in the United States, several of the cast members and production team had their names changed for the English audience.

Some parts of the soundtrack, composed by Francesco De Masi, are featured in the videogame Red Dead Revolver.

Cast
Anthony Steffen ...  Johnny Ashley 
Elisa Montés ...  Sybil 
Fernando Sancho ...  El Cachal / Sancho 
Roberto Miali ...   Jerry  
Loredana Nusciak ...  Emily 
Bruno Carotenuto ...  Rosario  
José Manuel Martín ...  El Gringo / Chulo 
Spartaco Conversi ...  Bill 
Alfredo Varelli ...  1st Sheriff
Gianni Manera ...  Gambler 
Franco Fantasia ...  Sheriff of Wishville  
Annie Giss ...  Julie / Starlight 
Franco Gulà ...  Walt 
Renato Terra ...  Manuel 
Nino Musco...  Oeste ( 
Miriam Salonicco ...  Oeste's Wife 
David Mancori ...  Jerry as Child 
Fortunato Arena ...  Prisoner 
Silvana Bacci ...  Mexican Woman 
Halina Zalewska ...  Mexican Woman

Plot
The bandit Sancho kills the wife of Johnny Ashley, and because he cannot have a child of his own he abducts Johnny's son Jerry to raise him as his own. Jerry grows up to become an evil man who kills his fiancée Sybil when she threatens to disclose his plans for a robbery. Johnny keeps searching to find his son and avenge his wife. He crosses paths with Jerry and in turn they save the other man's life. Eventually Johnny confronts and kills Sancho. He learns about Jerry from Sancho's wife. When the son comes to avenge his ”father,” Johnny tries to disarm him, but Jerry is accidentally killed without learning the truth.

External links 
 

1966 films
Italian Western (genre) films
Spaghetti Western films
1966 Western (genre) films
1960s Italian-language films
Films directed by Alberto Cardone
Films scored by Francesco De Masi
1960s Italian films